Louise Hauge (born 13 July 1978), is a Danish athlete who competes in compound archery. Her achievements include two gold medals at the European Grand Prix, a silver medal at the 2004 European Archery Championships, and becoming the world number one ranked archer from July 2004 to June 2005.

References

1978 births
Living people
Danish female archers
World Archery Championships medalists
21st-century Danish women